José Joaquín Moreno Verdú (born 6 January 1975), known as Josico, is a Spanish retired footballer who played as a defensive midfielder, currently a manager.

His 16-year professional career was mainly associated with Las Palmas and Villarreal (six years apiece), and he amassed La Liga totals of 240 matches and 13 goals over nine seasons.

Playing career
Born in Hellín, Province of Albacete, Josico made his debut in La Liga with Albacete Balompié in the 1995–96 season, immediately after joining from local amateurs Hellín Deportivo. He played 28 matches (scoring twice), but his team was relegated after five consecutive years in the top division; his first game in the competition occurred on 18 November 1995, featuring the full 90 minutes in a 3–0 away loss against FC Barcelona.

Josico went on to represent UD Las Palmas for four seasons, joining Villarreal CF for the 2002–03 campaign, where he played a major part in the club's domestic and European consolidation: in 2004–05 the player made 29 appearances – 28 as starter – as the Valencian Community side finished third, as well as being their captain.

Deemed surplus to requirements by Villarreal boss Manuel Pellegrini, Josico joined Fenerbahçe S.K. on 28 August 2008 as the Süper Lig side was coached by former Spain manager Luis Aragonés. After just one season in Turkey, where he was used sparingly, he was released, and quickly signed with one of his first clubs, Las Palmas in the Segunda División, at the same time of former teammate Antonio Guayre.

In late May 2011, after having contributed 25 matches to help his team to avoid relegation, the 36-year-old Josico announced his retirement from professional football. He returned to the Canary Islands the following year, being charged with watching the opposing teams.

Coaching career
Josico was appointed Las Palmas' first-team manager on 26 May 2014, replacing the fired Sergio Lobera after a 2–3 home loss against Recreativo de Huelva. He still managed to lead the side to the sixth position in the regular season, then ousted Sporting de Gijón 2–0 on aggregate in the top-flight promotion playoffs.

On 3 July 2014, Josico moved to the Canarians' reserve team in the Segunda División B. In the following years, he continued working in the lower leagues.

Managerial statistics

Honours
Las Palmas
Segunda División: 1999–2000

Villarreal
UEFA Intertoto Cup: 2003, 2004

Spain U21
UEFA European Under-21 Championship: 1998

References

External links

1975 births
Living people
People from Hellín
Sportspeople from the Province of Albacete
Spanish footballers
Footballers from Castilla–La Mancha
Association football midfielders
La Liga players
Segunda División players
Albacete Balompié players
UD Las Palmas players
Villarreal CF players
Süper Lig players
Fenerbahçe S.K. footballers
Spain under-21 international footballers
Spanish expatriate footballers
Expatriate footballers in Turkey
Spanish expatriate sportspeople in Turkey
Spanish football managers
Segunda División managers
Segunda División B managers
Segunda Federación managers
UD Las Palmas managers
FC Jumilla managers
CD Atlético Baleares managers
Elche CF managers